Rutilia is a large genus of medium to large (>20mm) flies in the family Tachinidae native to Australia and the Oriental region, though notably absent from New Zealand. Like the vast majority of tachinid flies, Rutilia species are parasitoids of other insects, specifically Rutilia are known to be parasitoids of late instar larvae of scarab beetles.

Subgenera and species
Rutilia is a large genus comprising seven subgenera.
Rutilia (Ameniamima) Crosskey, 1973
Rutilia argentinifera Bigot, 1874 (Subgenus Type)
Rutilia cingulata (Malloch, 1930)
Rutilia argentinifera (Malloch, 1930)
Rutilia (Chrysorutilia) Townsend, 1915
Rutilia atrox (Enderlein, 1936)
Rutilia caeruleata (Enderlein, 1936)
Rutilia caesia (Enderlein, 1930)
Rutilia chersipho (Walker, 1849)
Rutilia corona Curran, 1930
Rutilia cryptica Crosskey, 1973
Rutilia decora Guerin-Meneville, 1843
Rutilia formosa Robineau-Desvoidy, 1830 (Subgenus Type)
Rutilia goerlingiana (Enderlein, 1936)
Rutilia idesa (Walker, 1849)
Rutilia imperialis Guerin-Meneville, 1843
Rutilia imperialoides (Crosskey, 1973)
Rutilia luzona (Enderlein, 1936)
Rutilia nana (Enderlein, 1936)
Rutilia panthea (Walker, 1874)
Rutilia rubriceps Macquart, 1847
Rutilia splendida (Donovan, 1805)
Rutilia townsendi Crosskey, 1973
Rutilia transversa Malloch, 1936
Rutilia (Donovanius) Enderlein, 1936
Rutilia agalmiodes (Enderlein, 1936)
Rutilia analoga Macquart, 1851
Rutilia bisetosa (Enderlein, 1936)
Rutilia brunneipennis (Crosskey, 1973)
Rutilia ethoda (Enderlein, 1849)
Rutilia inusta (Wiedemann, 1830)
Rutilia lepida Guerin-Meneville, 1843
Rutilia nigrihirta Malloch, 1935
Rutilia pellucens Macquart, 1846
Rutilia regalis Guerin-Meneville, 1831 (Subgenus Type)
Rutilia retusa (Fabricius, 1775)
Rutilia sabrata (Walker, 1849)
Rutilia savaiiensis Malloch, 1935
Rutilia spinolae Rondani, 1864
Rutilia viridinigra Macquart, 1846
Rutilia (Grapholostylum) Macquart, 1851
Rutilia albovirida Malloch, 1929
Rutilia dorsomaculata (Macquart, 1851) (Subgenus Type)
Rutilia micans Malloch, 1929
Rutilia subtustomentosa Macquart, 1851
Rutilia (Microrutilia) Townsend, 1915
Rutilia cupreiventris Malloch, 1936
Rutilia fulviventris Bigot, 1874
Rutilia hirticeps Malloch, 1929
Rutilia liris (Walker, 1849)
Rutilia media Macquart, 1846
Rutilia minor Macquart, 1846 (Subgenus Type)
Rutilia nigriceps Malloch, 1929
Rutilia nigripes (Enderlein, 1936)
Rutilia (Neorutilia) Malloch, 1936
Rutilia simplex Malloch, 1936 (Subgenus Type)
Rutilia (Rutilia) Robineau-Desvoidy, 1830
Rutilia confusa (Malloch, 1929)
Rutilia dentata Crosskey, 1973
Rutilia setosa Malloch, 1929
Rutilia vivipara (Fabricius, 1805) (Genus Type species)

References

Diptera of Australasia
Diptera of Asia
Tachinidae genera
Dexiinae
Taxa named by Jean-Baptiste Robineau-Desvoidy